Manuel "Manolo" Sánchez Murias (born 27 November 1976) is a Spanish former footballer who played as a left winger, currently a manager.

Playing career
Born in Gijón, Sánchez played three years with local Sporting de Gijón's first team, his La Liga output consisting of 19 games – no goals – in the 1997–98 season, which ended in relegation with an all-low 13 points. In summer 2000 he moved to RC Celta de Vigo, appearing in seven more matches in the top flight (scoring against CA Osasuna in a 2–0 away win on 10 September 2000) and being loaned several times for the duration of his contract, mostly to Segunda División sides.

In 2005–06 campaign, Sánchez joined Racing de Ferrol also of the second division, going on to experience two relegations and one promotion with the Galicians. He retired in June 2008, at the age of 31.

Coaching career
Sánchez began his manager career immediately after retiring, starting with his last club as a player in the Segunda División B. He was relieved of his duties on 24 February 2009.

After two years working with Sporting's youth academy, Sánchez was appointed reserve-team coach by the Asturians. However, after the end of the 2011–12 season, which ended in top-tier relegation, Javier Clemente was dismissed from the main squad and he was appointed his successor.

On 18 October 2012, after collecting five losses and only two wins in the league's first nine rounds, and immediately after disposing of CD Mirandés in the third round of the Copa del Rey (2–1 home victory), Sánchez was fired by Sporting. On 17 September of the following year he returned to the club, being named director of the football academy at Mareo.

Sánchez returned to Sporting B on 18 March 2019, as a replacement for Isma Piñera.

Managerial statistics

References

External links

1976 births
Living people
Footballers from Gijón
Spanish footballers
Association football wingers
La Liga players
Segunda División players
Segunda División B players
Sporting de Gijón B players
Sporting de Gijón players
RC Celta de Vigo players
CA Osasuna players
Córdoba CF players
CD Numancia players
CD Tenerife players
Racing de Ferrol footballers
Spanish football managers
Segunda División managers
Segunda División B managers
Sporting de Gijón managers
Racing de Ferrol managers